Bancker may refer to:

People:
Emily Bancker (1861/62–1897), American stage actress
Evert Bancker (mayor) (1665–1734), American trader and politician, mayor of Albany, New York
Evert Bancker (speaker) (1721–1803), American merchant and politician, speaker of the New York state assembly
Mary E. C. Bancker (1860–?), American author
Gerard Bancker 1740–1799), American surveyor and politician, New York State Treasurer 
Studs Bancker (1853–1888), American professional baseball player

Places
Bancker, Louisiana

See also
Banker (disambiguation)